Strowan Aerodrome was an aerodrome constructed in 1942 by the Royal Australian Air Force as a satellite aerodrome west of Jerrys Plains, New South Wales, Australia during World War II.

The aerodrome was as a maintenance satellite field for RAAF Station Bulga near Singleton.

References

Former Royal Australian Air Force bases
Military establishments in the Hunter Region
Former military installations in New South Wales